Michael Nnachi Okoro (born 1 November 1940) is a Nigerian clergyman who was the Bishop of the Roman Catholic Diocese of Abakaliki from 19 February 1983 until his retirement on 6 July 2021.

Background and early life
Okoro is from Unwana in Afikpo North Local Government Area of Ebonyi State. He was born in Adiabo in Calabar, Cross River State. His is the last of 8 children. His father worked as the manager of a palm oil plantation in Calabar at the peak of his career.
For his primary education, he attended St Mary's Adiabo, Calabar from 1946 to 1952. His education in the above-mentioned school was halted following the retirement of his father and the subsequent relocation of his family to his hometown, Unwana, Afikpo. He continued his primary education in Unwana attending St Mary's Afikpo, St. Patrick's Ndibe and St Brigid's Ozizza in 1952, 1953 and 1954 respectively. He began his secondary education in St. Patrick's College, SPC, Calabar, briefly between 1955 and 1956. On making his intentions about wanting to become a priest, known to his mother who subsequently informed Right Reverend Thomas McGettrick, his transfer was processed to Queen of Apostles Junior Seminary, Afaha Obong, Akwa-Ibom State, where he stayed from 1957 till 1959. He wrote the West Africa Senior Secondary School Examination in 1958 and then proceeded to attending Bigard Memorial Seminary, Enugu.

Education

See also
 List of people from Ebonyi State

References

20th-century Roman Catholic bishops in Nigeria
1940 births
Living people
People from Ebonyi State
21st-century Roman Catholic bishops in Nigeria
Roman Catholic bishops of Abakaliki